John M. Torkelson is an American physicist.

Torkelson earned his bachelor's degree from the University of Wisconsin and doctorate at the University of Minnesota. He holds the Walter P. Murphy Professorship in Chemical and Biological Engineering and Materials Science and Engineering at Northwestern University. In 1999, Torkelson was elected a fellow of the American Physical Society "[f]or imaginative and successful applications of fluorescence spectroscopy to polymer physics issues ranging from free volume to free radical polymerization."

References

Living people
20th-century American physicists
21st-century American physicists
Fellows of the American Physical Society
Northwestern University faculty
University of Minnesota alumni
University of Wisconsin alumni
Year of birth missing (living people)